Anthony C. Hill (born September 9, 1957) is an American politician in the Democratic Party, who served in the Florida House of Representatives from 1992 to 2000, and in the Florida Senate from 2002 to 2011. In 2011, Hill announced he was resigning from the Florida Senate to serve as federal policy director in Jacksonville mayor Alvin Brown's administration.

References

External links
Florida Senate bio
Anthony Hill - Ballotpedia
Project Vote Smart - Senator Anthony C. 'Tony' Hill (FL) profile
Follow the Money - Anthony C. (Tony) Hill Sr.
2008 2006 2004 2002 State Senate campaign contributions
1998 State House campaign contributions

1957 births
2008 United States presidential electors
Candidates in the 2022 United States House of Representatives elections
Democratic Party Florida state senators
Living people
Democratic Party members of the Florida House of Representatives